H-8 is a 1958 Yugoslav film directed by Nikola Tanhofer starring Đurđa Ivezić, Boris Buzančić, and Antun Vrdoljak.

Plot

During a rainstorm, a reckless car driver causes the collision of a bus and a truck on a two-lane road between Zagreb and Belgrade. The film covers the events on the bus and the truck leading up to the crash, and the lives of the characters who end up in the crash.

Cast 
Đurđa Ivezić as Alma Novak
Boris Buzančić as Journalist Boris
Antun Vrdoljak as Photographer
Vanja Drach as Krešo
Marijan Lovrić as Rudolf Knez
Mira Nikolić as Young Mother
Antun Nalis as Thief Ivica
Mia Oremović
Stane Sever
Pero Kvrgić
Marija Kohn
Fabijan Šovagović
Ljubica Jović
Ivan Šubić
Siniša Knaflec

Background
The movie is based on a true story, in which the driver that caused a fatal 1957 bus-truck collision was never identified. "H-8" is the beginning of that driver's license plate, the only available information on the culprit's vehicle.

Reception
In a 1999 poll among 44 Croatian film critics and film historians, H-8 placed second in the list of all-time best Croatian films, behind One Song a Day Takes Mischief Away. In a similar 2020 poll, it placed first.

Awards 
 H-8 won the Big Golden Arena for Best Film at the 1958 Pula Film Festival.

See also 
List of Yugoslav films

References

External links 

1958 films
1950s Croatian-language films
Serbo-Croatian-language films
Films directed by Nikola Tanhofer
1958 drama films
Jadran Film films
Croatian drama films
Films set in Croatia
Films set in Yugoslavia
Drama films based on actual events
Croatian black-and-white films
Films about road accidents and incidents
Films set in Belgrade
Yugoslav drama films